Grove Township is one of seventeen townships in Adair County, Iowa, USA.  At the 2020 census, its population was 162.

History
Grove Township was organized in 1860.

Geography
According to the USGS, it contains two cemeteries: Adair County and Grove Center.

References

External links
 US-Counties.com
 City-Data.com

Townships in Adair County, Iowa
Townships in Iowa
1860 establishments in Iowa